The Crystal Singer series is a series of science fiction novels   by American writer Anne McCaffrey.  

The series is set on the planet Ballybran which is under a permanent biohazard travel restriction. Ballybran is home to one of the FSP's wealthiest, yet most reclusive organizations—the Heptite Guild. Source of invaluable crystals vital to various industries, the Heptite Guild is known to require absolute, perfect pitch in hearing and voice for all applicants, especially those seeking to mine crystal by song.

Novels in the series are:

 Crystal Singer (1982)  (first published in four parts in the anthologies Continuum 1, 2, 3, & 4, edited by Roger Elwood)
 Killashandra (1986)  (includes a Brainship from the Ship series by the same author, in the same setting, in a minor role. This was not a main character in any novel.)
 Crystal Line (1992)  (includes a Brainship from the Ship series by the same author, although not as a main character in any novel. The Brainship is also not the same one from Killashandra. Also includes a reference to the first Brainship in the original series (Helva), noting that her whereabouts were still unknown at the point of reference in the Crystal Singer timeline.

See also 
 

Science fiction book series